Nigel Alfred Steven Atangana (born 9 September 1989) is a French professional footballer who plays as a defensive midfielder for National League club Eastleigh.

Career

Early career
Born in Corbeil-Essonnes, Atangana made his senior debuts with US Avranches in CFA 2, after having trials at Luton Town, Gillingham, West Bromwich Albion and Grays Athletic. After subsequently representing SU Dives, he moved to Spain, joining Girona FC and being assigned to CF Riudellots, the club's farm team. Atangana was called up to the main squad in Segunda División in November, but failed to appear with the club.

In the 2013 summer Atangana moved to US Gravelines Foot, also in France's fifth division. He appeared in 21 matches and scored once (the winner in a 2–1 home success against US Ailly-Sur-Somme on 1 December 2012).

Havant & Waterlooville
In September 2013, Atangana signed with Havant & Waterlooville. He made his debut on the 30th, starting in a 1–1 FA Trophy draw against Gloucester City.

Atangana made his league debut on 19 October, starting in a 0–0 draw against Dover Athletic. He scored his first goal for Hawks on 11 January of the following year, the game's only goal in a home win against Ebbsfleet United.

Atangana finished the season with 43 appearances and five goals, being named Havant & Waterlooville' Player of the Year.

Portsmouth
On 19 June 2014, Atangana signed a two-year contract with League Two side Portsmouth, for an undisclosed fee. He made his debut for the club on 9 August, coming on as a substitute for fellow debutant Craig Westcarr in a 1–1 away draw against Exeter City.

Atangana scored his first Pompey goal on 20 December, netting the equalizer in a 1–1 draw at Cheltenham Town. He appeared in 30 matches during the campaign, mainly due to the injury of starter James Dunne.

Leyton Orient
On 20 January 2016, Atangana joined Leyton Orient on an 18-month contract until the end of the 2016–17 season for an undisclosed fee. Atangana was given the number 15 upon arrival.

Cheltenham Town
On 28 May 2017, Atangana signed a two-year contract with League Two side Cheltenham Town. He officially joined the Robins on 1 July 2017 when his contract with Leyton Orient came to an end.

Exeter City
On 20 May 2019 he joined League Two team Exeter City Football Club after leaving Cheltenham Town following a long term Achilles injury.  Upon breaking into the side after recovering, he quickly became a fan favourite for his solid defensive play and his consistently high work rate, earning the fan-voted Player of the Month award for December.  He scored his first goal for the club in a 2-2 draw at home to Hartlepool United in the FA Cup first round. After the 2020-21 season, fans found out that he signed a three-year contract after Exeter's retained list stated he was under contract for the 2021-22 season. Atangana made 19 appearances during, but was released at the end of the 2021–22 season following Exeter's promotion to League One.

Eastleigh
On 2 August 2022, Atangana joined National League club Eastleigh.

Personal life
Atangana is of Cameroonian descent.

Career statistics

References

External links
 
 
 Hat-Trick profile 

1989 births
Living people
People from Corbeil-Essonnes
Footballers from Essonne
French footballers
Association football midfielders
US Avranches players
SU Dives-Cabourg players
Union Sportive Gravelines Football players
Havant & Waterlooville F.C. players
Portsmouth F.C. players
Leyton Orient F.C. players
Cheltenham Town F.C. players
Exeter City F.C. players
Eastleigh F.C. players
National League (English football) players
English Football League players
French expatriate footballers
Expatriate footballers in England
French expatriate sportspeople in England
French sportspeople of Cameroonian descent